Omaha is the largest city in the U.S. state of Nebraska and the county seat of Douglas County. The nation's 39th-largest city, Omaha's 2020 census population was 486,051.

Omaha is the anchor of the eight-county, bi-state Omaha-Council Bluffs metropolitan area. The Omaha Metropolitan Area is the 58th-largest in the United States, with a population of 967,604. The Omaha-Council Bluffs-Fremont, NE-IA Combined Statistical Area (CSA) totaled 1,004,771, according to 2020 estimates. Approximately 1.5 million people reside within the Greater Omaha area, within a  radius of Downtown Omaha. It is ranked as a global city by the Globalization and World Cities Research Network, which in 2020 gave it "sufficiency" status.

Omaha's pioneer period began in 1854, when the city was founded by speculators from neighboring Council Bluffs, Iowa. The city was founded along the Missouri River, and a crossing called Lone Tree Ferry earned the city its nickname, the "Gateway to the West". Omaha introduced this new West to the world in 1898, when it played host to the World's Fair, dubbed the Trans-Mississippi Exposition. During the 19th century, Omaha's central location in the United States spurred the city to become an important national transportation hub. Throughout the rest of the 19th century, the transportation and jobbing sectors were important in the city, along with its railroads and breweries. In the 20th century, the Omaha Stockyards, once the world's largest, and its meatpacking plants gained international prominence.

Today, Omaha is the home to the headquarters of four Fortune 500 companies: conglomerate Berkshire Hathaway; one of the world's largest construction companies, Kiewit Corporation; insurance and financial firm Mutual of Omaha; and the United States' largest railroad operator, Union Pacific Corporation. Berkshire Hathaway is headed by local investor Warren Buffett, one of the wealthiest people in the world, according to a decade's worth of Forbes rankings, some of which have ranked him as high as No. 1.

Omaha is also the home to five Fortune 1000 headquarters: Green Plains, Intrado, TD Ameritrade, Valmont Industries, and Werner Enterprises. Also headquartered in Omaha are the following: First National Bank of Omaha, the third largest privately held bank in the United States; three of the nation's ten largest architecture/engineering firms (DLR Group, HDR, Inc., and Leo A Daly); and the Gallup Organization, of Gallup Poll fame, and its riverfront Gallup University.

Notable modern Omaha inventions include the following: the "pink hair curler" created at Omaha's Tip-Top Products; Butter Brickle Ice Cream, and the Reuben sandwich, conceived by a chef at the then–Blackstone Hotel on 36th and Farnam Streets; cake mix, developed by Duncan Hines, then a division of Omaha's Nebraska Consolidated Mills, the forerunner to today's ConAgra Foods; center-pivot irrigation by the Omaha company now known as Valmont Corporation; Raisin Bran, developed by Omaha's Skinner Macaroni Co.; the first ski lift in the U.S., in 1936, by Omaha's Union Pacific Corp.; the Top 40 radio format, pioneered by Todd Storz, scion of Omaha's Storz Brewing Co. and head of Storz Broadcasting, and first used in the U.S. at Omaha's KOWH Radio; and the TV dinner, developed by Omaha's Carl A. Swanson.

History

Various Native American tribes had lived in the land that became Omaha, including since the 17th century, the Omaha and Ponca,  Dhegihan-Siouan language people who had originated in the lower Ohio River valley and migrated west by the early 17th century; Pawnee, Otoe, Missouri, and Ioway. The word Omaha (actually Umoⁿhoⁿ or Umaⁿhaⁿ) in the Omaha language means "Upstream People" or "Against The Current."

In 1804 the Lewis and Clark Expedition passed the riverbanks where the city of Omaha would be built. Immediately south of that area, Americans built several fur trading outposts in succeeding years, including Fort Lisa in 1812; Fort Atkinson in 1819; Cabanné's Trading Post, built in 1822, and Fontenelle's Post in 1823, in what became Bellevue. There was fierce competition among fur traders until John Jacob Astor created the monopoly of the American Fur Company. The Mormons built a town called Cutler's Park in the area in 1846. While it was temporary, the settlement provided the basis for further development.

Through 26 separate treaties with the United States federal government, Native American tribes in Nebraska gradually ceded the lands that now make up the state. The treaty and cession involving the Omaha area occurred in 1854 when the Omaha Tribe ceded most of east-central Nebraska. Logan Fontenelle, an interpreter for the Omaha and signatory to the 1854 treaty, played an essential role in those proceedings.

Pioneer Omaha
Before it was legal to claim land in Indian Country, William D. Brown operated the Lone Tree Ferry that brought settlers from Council Bluffs, Iowa to the area that became Omaha. Brown is generally credited as having the first vision for a city where Omaha now sits. The passage of the Kansas–Nebraska Act in 1854 was presaged by the staking out of claims around the area to become Omaha by residents from neighboring Council Bluffs. On July 4, 1854, the city was informally established at a picnic on Capital Hill, current site of Omaha Central High School. Soon after, the Omaha Claim Club was formed to provide vigilante justice for claim jumpers and others who infringed on the land of many of the city's founding fathers. Some of this land, which now wraps around Downtown Omaha, was later used to entice Nebraska Territorial legislators to an area called Scriptown. The U.S. Supreme Court later ruled against numerous landowners whose violent actions were condemned in Baker v. Morton.

Many of Omaha's founding figures stayed at the Douglas House or the Cozzens House Hotel. Dodge Street was important early in the city's early commercial history; North 24th Street and South 24th Street also developed independently as business districts. Early pioneers were buried in Prospect Hill Cemetery and Cedar Hill Cemetery. Cedar Hill closed in the 1860s and its graves were moved to Prospect Hill, where pioneers were later joined by soldiers from Fort Omaha, African Americans and early European immigrants. There are several other historical cemeteries in Omaha, historical Jewish synagogues and historical Christian churches dating from the pioneer era, as well. Two sculpture parks, Pioneer Courage and Spirit of Nebraska's Wilderness and The Transcontinental Railroad, celebrate the city's pioneering history.

19th century

The economy of Omaha boomed and busted through its early years. In 1858, the Omaha Daily Republican was founded by the Omaha Printing Company (rebranded Aradius Group, 2016), it was Nebraska's first regional newspaper–founded before Nebraska claimed statehood. Omaha was a stopping point for settlers and prospectors heading west, either overland or by the Missouri River. The steamboat Bertrand sank north of Omaha on its way to the goldfields in 1865. Its massive collection of artifacts is on display at the nearby Desoto National Wildlife Refuge. The jobbing and wholesaling district brought new jobs, followed by the railroads and the stockyards. Groundbreaking for the First transcontinental railroad in 1863, provided an essential developmental boom for the city. In 1862, the U.S. Congress allowed the Union Pacific Railroad to begin building westward railways; in January 1866 it commenced construction out of Omaha.

The Union Stockyards, another important part of the city's development, were founded in South Omaha in 1883. Within 20 years, Omaha had four of the five major meatpacking companies in the United States. By the 1950s, half the city's workforce was employed in meatpacking and processing. Meatpacking, jobbing and railroads were responsible for most of the growth in the city from the late 19th century through the early decades of the 20th century.

Immigrants soon created ethnic enclaves throughout the city, including Irish in Sheelytown in South Omaha; Germans in the Near North Side, joined by the European Jews and black migrants from the South; Little Italy and Little Bohemia in South Omaha. Beginning in the late 19th century, Omaha's upper class lived in posh enclaves throughout the city, including the south and north Gold Coast neighborhoods, Bemis Park, Kountze Place, Field Club and throughout Midtown Omaha. They traveled the city's sprawling park system on boulevards designed by renowned landscape architect Horace Cleveland. The Omaha Horse Railway first carried passengers throughout the city, as did the later Omaha Cable Tramway Company and several similar companies. In 1888, the Omaha and Council Bluffs Railway and Bridge Company built the Douglas Street Bridge, the first pedestrian and wagon bridge between Omaha and Council Bluffs.

Gambling, drinking and prostitution were widespread in the 19th century, first rampant in the city's Burnt District and later in the Sporting District. Controlled by Omaha's political boss Tom Dennison by 1890, criminal elements enjoyed support from Omaha's "perpetual" mayor, "Cowboy Jim" Dahlman, nicknamed for his eight terms as mayor.

Calamities such as the Great Flood of 1881 did not slow down the city's violence. In 1882, the Camp Dump Strike pitted state militia against unionized strikers, drawing national attention to Omaha's labor troubles. The Governor of Nebraska had to call in U.S. Army troops from nearby Fort Omaha to protect strikebreakers for the Burlington Railroad, bringing along Gatling guns and a cannon for defense. When the event ended, one man was dead and several were wounded. In 1891, a mob hanged Joe Coe, an African-American porter after he was accused of raping a white girl. There were also several other riots and civil unrest events in Omaha during this period.

In 1898, Omaha's leaders, under the guidance of Gurdon Wattles, held the Trans-Mississippi and International Exposition, touted as a celebration of agricultural and industrial growth throughout the Midwest. The Indian Congress, which drew more than 500 American Indians from across the country, was held simultaneously. More than 2 million visitors attended these events at Kountze Park and the Omaha Driving Park in the Kountze Place neighborhood.

20th century
With dramatically increasing population in the 20th century, competition and fierce labor struggles led to major civil unrest. In 1900, Omaha was the center of a national uproar over the kidnapping of Edward Cudahy, Jr., the son of a local meatpacking magnate.

The city's labor and management clashed in bitter strikes, racial tension escalated as Blacks were hired as strikebreakers, and ethnic strife broke out. A major riot by earlier immigrants in South Omaha destroyed the city's Greek Town in 1909, completely driving out the Greek population.

The civil rights movement in Omaha has roots that extend back to 1912, when the first chapter of the National Association for the Advancement of Colored People west of the Mississippi River was founded in the city.

The Omaha Easter Sunday Tornado of 1913 destroyed much of the city's African-American community, in addition to much of Midtown Omaha.

Six years later, in 1919, the city was caught up in the Red Summer riots when thousands of whites marched from South Omaha to the courthouse to lynch a Black worker, Willy Brown, a suspect in an alleged rape of a white woman. The mob burned the Douglas County Courthouse to get the prisoner, causing more than $1 million damage. They hanged and shot Will Brown, then burned his body. Troops were called in from Fort Omaha to quell the riot, prevent more crowds gathering in South Omaha, and to protect the Black community in North Omaha.

The culture of North Omaha thrived throughout the 1920s through 1950s, with several creative figures, including Tillie Olsen, Wallace Thurman, Lloyd Hunter, and Anna Mae Winburn emerging from the vibrant Near North Side.

Musicians created their own world in Omaha, and also joined national bands and groups that toured and appeared in the city.

After the tumultuous Great Depression of the 1930s, Omaha rebounded with the development of Offutt Air Force Base just south of the city. The Glenn L. Martin Company operated a factory there in the 1940s that produced 521 B-29 Superfortresses, including the Enola Gay and Bockscar used in the atomic bombing of Japan in World War II.

The construction of Interstates 80, 480 and 680, along with the North Omaha Freeway, spurred development. There was also controversy, particularly in North Omaha, where new routes bisected several neighborhoods. Creighton University hosted the DePorres Club, an early civil rights group whose use of sit-in strategies for integration of public facilities predated the national movement.

Following the development of the Glenn L. Martin Company bomber manufacturing plant in Bellevue at the beginning of World War II, the relocation of the Strategic Air Command to the Omaha suburb in 1948 provided a major economic boost to the area.

From the 1950s through the 1960s, more than 40 insurance companies were headquartered in Omaha, including Woodmen of the World and Mutual of Omaha. By the late 1960s, the city rivaled, but never surpassed, the United States insurance centers of Hartford, Connecticut, New York City and Boston.

After surpassing Chicago in meat processing by the late 1950s, Omaha suffered the loss of 10,000 jobs as both the railroad and meatpacking industries restructured. The city struggled for decades to shift its economy as workers suffered. Poverty became more entrenched among families who remained in North Omaha.

In the 1960s, three major race riots along North 24th Street destroyed the Near North Side's economic base, with recovery slow for decades.

Since the 1970s, Omaha has continued expanding and growing, mostly to available land to the west. West Omaha has become home to the majority of the city's population. North and South Omaha's populations continue to be centers of new immigrants, with economic and racial diversity. In 1975 a major tornado, along with a major blizzard, caused more than $100 million in damages in 1975 dollars.

Downtown Omaha has since been rejuvenated in numerous ways, starting with the development of Gene Leahy Mall and W. Dale Clark Library in the late 1970s. In the 1980s, Omaha's fruit warehouses were converted into a shopping area called the Old Market.

The demolition of Jobber's Canyon in 1989 led to the creation of the ConAgra Foods campus. Several nearby buildings, including the Nash Block, have been converted into condominiums. The stockyards were taken down; the only surviving building is the Livestock Exchange Building, which was converted to multi-use and listed on the National Register of Historic Places.

A historic preservation movement in Omaha has led to a number of historic structures and districts being designated Omaha Landmarks or listed on the National Register of Historic Places. Much of the push toward preservation came after Omaha gained the notorious designation of having, in 1989, demolished the largest-ever National Register historic district in the United States, a record that still stands as of 2013. The Jobbers Canyon Historic District, along the Missouri River, was felled for a new headquarters campus for ConAgra Foods, a company which threatened to relocate if Omaha did not allow them to raze the city's historic district. The Jobber's Canyon warehouses had before then been allowed to deteriorate and were the scene of several fires set by the homeless population that had come to live in the abandoned buildings. At the time, there were no plans in place for revitalizing the buildings.

In the 1980s and 1990s, Omaha also saw major company headquarters leave the city, including Enron, founded in the city in 1930 and taken to Houston in 1987 by the now-notorious Kenneth Lay. First Data Corporation, a large credit-card processor, also was founded in Omaha in 1969; as of 2009, its headquarters are in Atlanta.

Inacom, founded in Omaha in 1991, was a technology company that customized computer systems for large businesses, and was on the Fortune 500 list from 1997 until 2000, when it filed for bankruptcy. Northwestern Bell, the Bell System affiliate for Northwestern states, had its headquarters in Omaha from its founding in 1896 until it moved to Denver in 1991 as US West. Level 3 Communications, a large Tier 1 network provider, was founded in Omaha in 1985 as Kiewit Diversified Group, a division of Kiewit Corporation, a Fortune 500 construction and mining company still headquartered in Omaha; Level 3 moved to Denver in 1998. World Com was founded by a merger with Omaha's MFS Communications, started as Metropolitan Fiber Systems in 1993. MFS, backed by Kiewit Corporation CEO Walter Scott and Warren Buffett, purchased UUNET, one of the largest Internet backbones in the world, for $2 billion in 1996. The now-infamous Bernie Ebbers purchased the much larger MFS for $14.3 billion in 1997 under his World Com. He moved headquarters of the merged company from Omaha to Mississippi.

21st century

Around the start of the 21st century, several new downtown skyscrapers and cultural institutions were built. The creation of the city's new North Downtown included the construction of the CenturyLink Center and the Slowdown/Film Streams development at North 14th and Webster Streets. Construction of the new TD Ameritrade Park began in 2009 and was completed in 2011, also in the North Downtown area, near the CenturyLink Center. TD Ameritrade Park is now the home of the College World Series, an event tourists flock to each year.

New construction has occurred throughout the city since the start of the 21st century. Important retail and office developments have occurred in West Omaha such as the Village Pointe shopping center and several business parks including First National Business Park and parks for Bank of the West and C&A Industries, Inc and Morgan Stanley Smith Barney and several others. Downtown and Midtown Omaha have both seen the development of a significant number of condominiums in recent years. In Midtown Omaha significant mixed-use projects are underway. The site of the former Ak-Sar-Ben arena has been redeveloped into a mixed-use development Aksarben Village. In January 2009 Blue Cross Blue Shield of Nebraska announced plans to build a new 10 story, $98 million headquarters, in the Aksarben Village, completed in Spring 2011. Gordmans is also building their new corporate headquarters in Aksarben. The other major mixed-use development is Midtown Crossing at Turner Park. Developed by Mutual of Omaha, the development includes several condominium towers and retail businesses built around Omaha's Turner Park.

The Holland Performing Arts Center opened in 2005 near the Gene Leahy Mall and the Union Pacific Center opened in 2004.

There have also been several developments along the Missouri River waterfront in downtown. The Bob Kerrey Pedestrian Bridge was opened to foot and bicycle traffic on September 28, 2008. Started in 2003, RiverFront Place Condos first phase was completed in 2006 and is fully occupied and the second phase was opened in 2011. The development along Omaha's riverfront is attributed with prompting the City of Council Bluffs to move their own riverfront development time line forward.

In the summers of 2008, 2012, 2016, and 2021 the United States Olympic Team swimming trials were held in Omaha, at the Qwest/Century Link Center. These events were highlights in the city's sports community, as well as a showcase for redevelopment in the downtown area.

Geography

Situated in the Midwestern United States on the bank of the Missouri River in eastern Nebraska, much of Omaha is built in the Missouri River Valley. Other significant bodies of water in the Omaha-Council Bluffs metropolitan area include Lake Manawa, Papillion Creek, Carter Lake, Platte River and the Glenn Cunningham Lake. The city's land has been altered considerably with substantial land grading throughout Downtown Omaha and scattered across the city. East Omaha sits on a flood plain west of the Missouri River. The area is the location of Carter Lake, an oxbow lake. The lake was once the site of East Omaha Island and Florence Lake, which dried up in the 1920s.

The Omaha-Council Bluffs metropolitan area consists of eight counties; five in Nebraska and three in Iowa. The metropolitan area now includes Harrison, Pottawattamie, and Mills Counties in Iowa and Washington, Douglas, Sarpy, Cass, and Saunders Counties in Nebraska. This area was formerly referred to only as the Omaha Metropolitan Statistical Area and consisted of only five counties: Pottawattamie in Iowa, and Washington, Douglas, Cass, and Sarpy in Nebraska. The Omaha-Council Bluffs combined statistical area comprises the Omaha-Council Bluffs metropolitan statistical area and the Fremont Micropolitan statistical area; the CSA has a population of 858,720 (2005 Census Bureau estimate). Omaha ranks as the 42nd-largest city in the United States, and is the core city of its 60th-largest metropolitan area. There are no consolidated city-counties in the area; the City of Omaha studied the possibility extensively through 2003 and concluded, "The City of Omaha and Douglas County should merge into a municipal county, work to commence immediately, and that functional consolidations begin immediately in as many departments as possible, including but not limited to parks, fleet management, facilities management, local planning, purchasing and personnel."

Geographically, Omaha is considered as being in the "Heartland" of the United States. Important environmental impacts on the natural habitat in the area include the spread of invasive plant species, restoring prairies and bur oak savanna habitats, and managing the whitetail deer population.

Omaha is home to several hospitals, mostly along Dodge Street (US6). Being the county seat, it is also the location of the county courthouse.

Neighborhoods

Omaha is generally divided into six geographic areas: Downtown, Midtown, North Omaha, South Omaha, West Omaha, and East Omaha. West Omaha includes the Miracle Hills, Boys Town, Regency, and Gateway areas. The city has a wide range of historical and new neighborhoods and suburbs that reflect its socioeconomic diversity. Early neighborhood development happened in ethnic enclaves, including Little Italy, Little Bohemia, Little Mexico and Greek Town. According to U.S. Census data, five European ethnic enclaves existed in Omaha in 1880, expanding to nine in 1900.

Around the start of the 20th century. the City of Omaha annexed several surrounding communities, including Florence, Dundee and Benson. At the same time, the city annexed all of South Omaha, including the Dahlman and Burlington Road neighborhoods. From its first annexation in 1857 (of East Omaha) to its controversial annexation of Elkhorn in 2007, Omaha has continually had an eye towards growth.

Starting in the 1950s, development of highways and new housing led to the movement of the middle class to suburbs in West Omaha. Some of the movement was designated as white flight from racial unrest in the 1960s. Newer and poorer migrants lived in older housing close to downtown; those residents who were more established moved west into newer housing. Some suburbs are gated communities or have become edge cities. Recently, Omahans have made strides to revitalize the downtown and Midtown areas with the redevelopment of the Old Market, Turner Park, Gifford Park, and the designation of the Omaha Rail and Commerce Historic District.

Climate
Omaha, due to its latitude of 41.26˚ N and location far from moderating bodies of water or mountain ranges, displays a hot-summer humid continental climate (Köppen: Dfa). July averages , with average relative humidity around 70% which then leads to relatively frequent thunderstorms. Snow is the most common precipitation in winter, with average seasonal snowfall being .

Based on 30-year averages obtained from NOAA's National Climatic Data Center for the months of December, January and February, Weather Channel ranked Omaha the 5th coldest major U.S. city as of 2014.

Demographics

2020 census
As of the census of 2020, there were 486,051 people and 186,883 households. The population density was 3,361 inhabitants per square mile (1,297/km2). The city's racial makeup was 77.5% White, 12.3% African American, 0.6% Native American, 3.8% Asian, 0% Pacific Islander, 3.4% from two or more races. Hispanic or Latino people of any race were 13.9% of the population. Non-Hispanic Whites were 66.6% of the population.

2010 census
As of the census of 2010, there were 408,958 people, 162,627 households, and 96,477 families residing in the city. The city's racial makeup was 73.1% White, 13.7% African American, 0.8% Native American, 2.4% Asian, 0.1% Pacific Islander, 6.9% from other races, and 3.0% from two or more races. Hispanic or Latino people of any race were 13.1% of the population. Non-Hispanic Whites were 68.0% of the population.

There were 162,627 households, of which 31.3% had children under the age of 18 living with them, 40.6% were married couples living together, 13.7% had a female householder with no husband present, 4.9% had a male householder with no wife present, and 40.7% were non-families. 32.3% of all households were made up of individuals, and 9.3% had someone living alone who was at least 65 years old. The average household size was 2.45 and the average family size was 3.14.

The median age in the city was 33.5 years. 25.1% of residents were under the age of 18; 11.4% were between the ages of 18 and 24; 27.9% were from 25 to 44; 24.4% were from 45 to 64; and 11.4% were 65 years of age or older. The city's gender makeup was 49.2% male and 50.8% female.

The median household income (in 2017 dollars) from 2013 to 2017 was $53,789.

2000 census
As of the census of 2000, there were 390,007 people, 156,738 households, and 94,983 families residing within city limits. The population density was 3,370.7 people per square mile (1,301.5/km2). There were 165,731 housing units at an average density of 1,432.4 per square mile (553.1/km2). The city's racial makeup was 78.4% White, 13.3% African American, 0.7% Native American, 1.7% Asian, 0.1% Pacific Islander, 3.9% from other races, and 1.9% from two or more races. Hispanic or Latino of any race were 7.5% of the population.

The city's median household income was $40,006, and the median family income was $50,821. Males had a median income of $34,301 versus $26,652 for females. The city's per capita income was $21,756. About 11.3% of the population and 7.8% of families were below the poverty line, including 15.6% of those under the age of 18 and 7.4% of those 65 and older.

Crime

Omaha's rate of violent crimes per 100,000 residents has been lower than the average rates of three dozen United States cities of similar size. Unlike Omaha, those cities have experienced an increase in violent crime overall since 2003. Rates for property crime have decreased for both Omaha and its peer cities during the same time period. In 2006, Omaha was ranked for homicides as 46th out of the 72 cities in the United States of more than 250,000 in population.

As a major industrial city into the mid-20th century, Omaha shared in social tensions that came with rapid growth and the arrival of large numbers of immigrants and migrants. Persistent poverty resulting from racial discrimination and job losses generated different crimes in the late 20th century, with the drug trade and drug abuse becoming associated with violent crime rates, which climbed after 1986 as Los Angeles gangs made affiliates in the city.

Gambling in Omaha has been an important part of the city's history. From its founding in the 1850s through the 1930s, the city was known as a "wide-open" town where gambling of all sorts was openly accepted. By the 1950s, at the same time large-scale restructuring of the railroads, the meatpacking industry and other sectors caused widespread job losses and unemployment, Omaha reportedly had more illicit gambling than any other city in the nation. From the 1930s through the 1970s, a Mafia-based criminal element controlled gambling in the city.

As most forms of gambling are currently restricted in Nebraska, gambling in Omaha is limited to keno, lotteries, and parimutuel betting. This leaves Omahans to drive across the Missouri River to Council Bluffs, Iowa, where casinos are legal and many businesses operate. Recently, the National Indian Gaming Commission approved a controversial proposal made by the Ponca tribe of Nebraska. It will allow the tribe to build a casino in Carter Lake, Iowa, which sits on the west side of the Missouri River, adjacent to Omaha, where casinos are illegal.

People

Native Americans were the first residents of the Omaha area. The city of Omaha was established by white settlers from neighboring Council Bluffs who arrived from the Northeastern United States a few years earlier. While much of the early population was of Yankee stock, over the next 100 years numerous ethnic groups moved to the city. In 1910, the Census Bureau reported Omaha's population as 96.4% White and 3.6% Black. Irish immigrants in Omaha originally moved to an area in present-day North Omaha called Gophertown, as they lived in dug-out sod houses. That population was followed by Polish immigrants in the Sheelytown neighborhood, and many immigrants were recruited for jobs in South Omaha's stockyards and meatpacking industry. The German community in Omaha was largely responsible for founding its once-thriving beer industry, including the Metz, Krug, Falstaff and the Storz breweries.

Since its founding, ethnic groups in the city have clustered in enclaves in north, south and downtown Omaha. In its early days, the sometimes lawless nature of a new frontier city included crime, such as illicit gambling and riots.

In the early 20th century, Jewish immigrants set up many businesses along the North 24th Street commercial area. It suffered with the loss of industrial jobs in the 1960s and later, the shifting of population west of the city. The commercial area is now the center of the African-American community, concentrated in North Omaha. The African American community has maintained its social and religious base, while it is experiencing an economic revitalization.

The Little Italy neighborhood grew south of downtown, as many Italian immigrants came to the city to work in the Union Pacific shops. Scandinavians first came to Omaha as Mormon settlers in the Florence neighborhood. Czechs had a strong political and cultural voice in Omaha, and were involved in a variety of trades and businesses, including banks, wholesale houses, and funeral homes. The Notre Dame Academy and Convent and Czechoslovak Museum are legacies of their residence. Today the legacy of the city's early European immigrant populations is evident in many social and cultural institutions in Downtown and South Omaha.

Mexicans originally immigrated to Omaha to work in the rail yards. Today they account for most of South Omaha's Hispanic population and many have taken jobs in meat processing. Other large early ethnic populations in Omaha included Danes, Poles, and Swedes.

A growing number of African immigrants have made their homes in Omaha in the last twenty years. There are approximately 8,500 Sudanese living in Omaha, including the largest population of Sudanese refugees in the United States. Most have immigrated since 1995 because of warfare in Sudan. They represent ten ethnic groups, including the Nuer, Dinka, Equatorians, Maubans and Nubians. Most Sudanese people in Omaha speak the Nuer language. Other Africans have immigrated to Omaha as well, with one-third from Nigeria, and large populations from Kenya, Togo, Cameroon and Ghana.

With the expansion of railroad and industrial jobs in meatpacking, Omaha attracted many immigrants and migrants. As the major city in Nebraska, it has historically been more racially and ethnically diverse than the rest of the state. At times rapid population change, overcrowded housing and job competition have aroused racial and ethnic tensions. Around the start of the 20th century, violence towards new immigrants in Omaha often erupted out of suspicion and fear.

In 1909, anti-Greek sentiment flared after increased Greek immigration, and worsened their tendency to become strikebreakers. The killing of a policeman of Irish descent enraged the Irish community; an angry mob violently stormed the Greek neighborhood in Omaha in what would become known as the Greek Town Riot. That mob violence forced the Greek immigrant population to flee from the city. By 1910, 53.7% of Omaha's residents and 64.2% of South Omaha's residents were foreign born or had at least one parent born outside of America.

Six years after the Greek Town Riot, in 1915, a mob killed Juan Gonzalez, a Mexican immigrant, near Scribner, a town in the Greater Omaha metropolitan area. The event occurred after an Omaha Police Department officer investigated a criminal operation that sold goods stolen from the nearby railroad yards. Racial profiling targeted Gonzalez as the culprit. After escaping the city, he was trapped along the Elkhorn River, where the mob, including several policemen from Omaha, shot him more than twenty times. It was discovered Gonzalez was unarmed, and he had a reliable alibi for the time of the murder. No one was ever indicted for his killing.

In the fall of 1919, following Red Summer, postwar social and economic tensions, the earlier hiring of African Americans as strikebreakers, and job uncertainty contributed to a mob from South Omaha lynching Willy Brown and the ensuing Omaha Race Riot. Trying to defend Brown, the city's mayor, Edward Parsons Smith, was lynched also, surviving only after a quick rescue.

Like other industrial cities in the U.S., Omaha suffered severe job losses in the 1950s, more than 10,000 in all, as the railroad and meatpacking industries restructured. Stockyards and packing plants were located closer to ranches, and union achievements were lost as wages declined in surviving jobs. Many workers left the area if they could get to other jobs. Poverty deepened in areas of the city whose residents depended on those jobs, specifically North and South Omaha. At the same time, with reduced revenues, the city had less financial ability to respond to longstanding problems.

Despair after the April 1968 assassination of Martin Luther King Jr. contributed to riots in North Omaha, including one at the Logan Fontenelle Housing Project. For some, the civil rights movement in Omaha, Nebraska evolved towards black nationalism, as the Black Panther Party was involved in tensions in the late 1960s. Organizations such as the Black Association for Nationalism Through Unity became popular among the city's African-American youth. This tension culminated in the cause célèbre trial of the Rice/Poindexter Case, in which an Omaha Police Department officer was killed by a bomb while answering an emergency call.

Whites in Omaha have followed the white flight pattern, suburbanizing to West Omaha. In the late 1990s and early 2000s, gang violence and incidents between the Omaha Police and Black residents undermined relations between groups in North and South Omaha.

Economy

With diversification in several industries, including banking, insurance, telecommunications, architecture/construction, and transportation, Omaha's economy has grown since the early 1990s, and six national fiber optic networks converge in Omaha.

Omaha's most prominent businessman is Warren Buffett, nicknamed the "Oracle of Omaha", who is regularly ranked one of the richest people in the world. Four Omaha-based companies: Berkshire Hathaway, Union Pacific Railroad, Mutual of Omaha, and Kiewit Corporation, are among the Fortune 500.

Omaha is the headquarters of several other major corporations, including the Gallup Organization, TD Ameritrade, Werner Enterprises, First National Bank, Gavilon, Scoular and First Comp Insurance. Many other large national firms have major operations or operational headquarters in Omaha, including Bank of the West, First Data, Sojern, PayPal, LinkedIn, Pacific Life, MetLife and Conagra Brands. The city is also home to three of the 30 largest architecture firms in the United States, including HDR, Inc., DLR Group, Inc., and Leo A Daly.

Top employers
According to the Greater Omaha Economic Development Partnership, the largest regional employers are:

Tourism

Tourist attractions in Omaha include history, sports, outdoors and cultural experiences. Its principal tourist attractions are the Henry Doorly Zoo and the College World Series. The Old Market in Downtown Omaha is another major attraction and is important to the city's retail economy. The city has been a tourist destination for many years. Famous early visitors included British author Rudyard Kipling and General George Crook. In 1883 Omaha hosted the first official performance of the Buffalo Bill's Wild West Show for 8,000 attendees. In 1898 the city hosted more than 1 million visitors from across the United States at the Trans-Mississippi and International Exposition, a world's fair that lasted for more than half the year.

Research on leisure and hospitality situates Omaha in the same tier for tourists as the neighboring cities of Des Moines, Iowa; Topeka, Kansas; Kansas City, Missouri; Oklahoma City, Oklahoma; Denver, Colorado; and Sioux Falls, South Dakota. A recent study found investment of $1 million in cultural tourism generated approximately $83,000 in state and local taxes, and provided support for hundreds of jobs for the metropolitan area, which in turn led to additional tax revenue for government.

Arts and culture

Several national newspapers, including the Boston Globe and The New York Times  have lauded Omaha's historical and cultural attractions.

The city is home to the Omaha Community Playhouse, the largest community theater in the United States. The Omaha Symphony Orchestra and its modern Holland Performing Arts Center, the Opera Omaha at the Orpheum theater, the Blue Barn Theatre, American Midwest Ballet, and The Rose Theater form the backbone of Omaha's performing arts community. Opened in 1931, the Joslyn Art Museum has large art collections. Since its inception in 1976, Omaha Children's Museum has been a place where children can challenge themselves, discover how the world works and learn through play. The Bemis Center for Contemporary Arts, one of the nation's premier urban artist colonies, was founded in Omaha in 1981, and the Durham Museum is accredited with the Smithsonian Institution for traveling exhibits. The city is also home to the largest singly funded mural in the nation, "Fertile Ground", by Meg Saligman. The annual Omaha Blues, Jazz, & Gospel Festival celebrates local music along with the Omaha Black Music Hall of Fame.

In 1955, Omaha's Union Stockyards overtook Chicago's stockyards as the United States' meat packing center. This legacy is reflected in the cuisine of Omaha, with renowned steakhouses such as Gorat's and the recently closed Mister C's, as well as the retail chain Omaha Steaks.

Henry Doorly Zoo

The Henry Doorly Zoo is widely considered one of the premier zoos in the world. The zoo is home to the world's largest nocturnal exhibit and indoor swamp; the world's largest indoor rainforest, the world's largest indoor desert, and the largest geodesic dome in the world (13 stories tall). The zoo is Nebraska's number-one paid attendance attraction and has welcomed more than 25 million visitors over the past 40 years.

Old Market

The Old Market is a major historic district in Downtown Omaha listed on the National Register of Historical Places. Today, its warehouses and other buildings house shops, restaurants, bars, coffee shops, and art galleries. Downtown is also the location of the Omaha Rail and Commerce Historic District, which has several art galleries and restaurants. Lauritzen Gardens features  with a variety of landscaping, and the new Kenefick Park recognizes Union Pacific Railroad's long history in Omaha. North Omaha has several historical cultural attractions including the Dreamland Historical Project, Love's Jazz and Art Center, and the John Beasley Theater. The annual River City Roundup is celebrated at Fort Omaha, and the neighborhood of Florence celebrates its history during "Florence Days". Native Omaha Days is a biennial event celebrating Near North Side heritage.

Religious institutions reflect the city's heritage. The city's Christian community has several historical churches dating from the founding of the city. There are also all sizes of congregations, including small, medium and megachurches. Omaha hosts the only Church of Jesus Christ of Latter-day Saints temple in Nebraska along with a large Jewish community. There are 152 parishes in the Roman Catholic Archdiocese of Omaha, and several Eastern Orthodox congregations throughout the city.

Music

Omaha's rich history in rhythm and blues, and jazz gave rise to a number of influential bands, including Anna Mae Winburn's Cotton Club Boys and Lloyd Hunter's Seranaders. Rock and roll pioneer Wynonie Harris, jazz great Preston Love, drummer Buddy Miles, and Luigi Waites are among the city's homegrown talent. Doug Ingle from the late 1960s band Iron Butterfly was born in Omaha, as was indie folk singer-songwriter Elliott Smith, though both were raised elsewhere.

Today, the diverse culture of Omaha includes a variety of performance venues, museums, and musical heritage, including the historically significant jazz scene in North Omaha and the modern and influential "Omaha Sound".

Contemporary music groups either in or originally from Omaha include Mannheim Steamroller, Bright Eyes, The Faint, Cursive, Azure Ray, Tilly and the Wall, and 311. During the late 1990s, Omaha became nationally known as the birthplace of Saddle Creek Records, and the subsequent "Omaha Sound" was born from their bands' collective style.

Omaha also has a fledgling hip hop scene. Long-time bastion Houston Alexander, a one-time graffiti artist and professional Mixed Martial Arts competitor, is a local hip-hop radio show host. Cerone Thompson, known as "Scrybe", has had a number one single on college radio stations across the United States. He has also had several number one hits on the local hip hop station respectively titled, "Lose Control" and "Do What U Do". Other notable artists include Stylo of Mastered Trax Latino who holds a strong following in South Omaha and Mexico / Latin America.

Many ethnic and cultural bands have come from Omaha. The Omaha Black Music Hall of Fame celebrates the city's long history of African-American music and the Strathdon Caledonia Pipe Band carries on a Scottish legacy. Internationally renowned composer Antonín Dvořák wrote his Ninth ("New World") Symphony in 1893 based on his impressions of the region after visiting Omaha's robust Czech community. In the period surrounding World War I Valentin J. Peter encouraged Germans in Omaha to celebrate their rich musical heritage, too. Frederick Metz, Gottlieb Storz and Frederick Krug were influential brewers whose beer gardens kept many German bands active.

Landmark preservation

Omaha is home to dozens of nationally, regionally and locally significant landmarks. The city has more than a dozen historic districts, including Fort Omaha Historic District, Gold Coast Historic District, Omaha Quartermaster Depot Historic District, Field Club Historic District, Bemis Park Historic District, and the South Omaha Main Street Historic District. Omaha is notorious for its 1989 demolition of 24 buildings in the Jobbers Canyon Historic District, which represents to date the largest loss of buildings on the National Register. The only original building surviving of that complex is the Nash Block.

Omaha has almost one hundred individual properties listed on the National Register of Historic Places, including the Bank of Florence, Holy Family Church, the Christian Specht Building and the Joslyn Castle. There are also three properties designated as National Historic Landmarks.

Locally designated landmarks, including residential, commercial, religious, educational, agricultural and socially significant locations across the city, honor Omaha's cultural legacy and important history. The City of Omaha Landmarks Heritage Preservation Commission is the government body that works with the mayor of Omaha and the Omaha City Council to protect historic places. Important history organizations in the community include the Douglas County Historical Society.

Sports

Sports have been important in Omaha for more than a century, and the city plays host to three minor-league professional sports teams.

Omaha has hosted the annual June NCAA College World Series men's baseball tournament since 1950. It has been played at the downtown Charles Schwab Field since 2011.

The Omaha Sports Commission is a quasi-governmental nonprofit organization that coordinates much of the professional and amateur athletic activity in the city, including the 2008, 2012 and 2016 US Olympic Swimming Team Trials and the building of a new stadium in North Downtown. The University of Nebraska and the Commission co-hosted the 2008 National Collegiate Athletic Association (NCAA) Division One Women's Volleyball Championship in December of that year. The 2016 Big 10 Baseball Championship was also played at the College World Series Stadium. Another quasi-governmental board, the Metropolitan Entertainment and Convention Authority (MECA), was created by city voters in 2000, and is responsible for maintaining the CHI Health Center Omaha (formerly CenturyLink Center Omaha).

The Omaha Storm Chasers play at Werner Park. They won seven championships (in 1969, 1970, 1978, 1990, 2011, 2013, and 2014).
Omaha is also home to the Omaha Diamond Spirit, a collegiate summer baseball team that plays in the MINK league.

The Creighton University Bluejays compete in a number of NCAA Division I sports as members of the Big East Conference. The Bluejays play baseball at Charles Schwab Field, soccer at Morrison Stadium, and basketball at the 18,000 seat CHI Health Center Omaha. The Jays annually rank in the top 15 in attendance each year, averaging more than 16,000 people per game. 
The Omaha Mavericks, representing the University of Nebraska Omaha (UNO), also play basketball, baseball and soccer in NCAA Division I as members of The Summit League. The UNO men's ice hockey team plays in the National Collegiate Hockey Conference.

Ice hockey is a popular spectator sport in Omaha. The Omaha Lancers, a United States Hockey League team, play at the Ralston Arena. The Omaha Mavericks play in the on-campus Baxter Arena.

Omaha was home to an expansion team, the Nighthawks, in the United Football League from 2010 to 2011. The Omaha Beef indoor football team played at the Omaha Civic Auditorium until 2012 when they moved to the new Ralston Arena. 

Omaha was the legendary catchword of Pro Football Hall of Fame Quarterback Peyton Manning. In 2021 he launched Omaha Productions.

The Kansas City-Omaha Kings, an NBA franchise, played in both cities from 1972 to 1978, before decamping solely to Kansas City until 1985, when the team moved to its current home of Sacramento.

The Cox Classic golf tournament was part of the Web.com Tour from 1996 to 2013. The circuit returned to Omaha in 2017 with the Pinnacle Bank Championship.

Parks and recreation

Omaha has a thriving running community and many miles of paved running and biking trails throughout the city and surrounding communities. The Omaha Marathon involves a half-marathon and a  race that takes place annually in September. Omaha also has a history of curling, including multiple junior national champions.
The city's historic boulevards were originally designed by Horace Cleveland in 1889 to work with the parks to create a seamless flow of trees, grass and flowers throughout the city. Florence Boulevard and Fontenelle Boulevard are among the remnants of this system. They include the American Discovery Trail, which traverses the entire United States, and the Lewis and Clark National Historic Trail passes through Omaha as it travels  westward from Illinois to Oregon. Trails throughout the area are included in comprehensive plans for the city of Omaha, the Omaha metropolitan area, Douglas County, and long-distance coordinated plans between the municipalities of southeast Nebraska. The city also has a park dedicated to pollinating bees and insects called ‘Pacific Preserve’

Government

Omaha has a strong mayor form of government, along with a city council elected from seven districts across the city. The mayor is Jean Stothert, who was elected in May 2013, re-elected May 10, 2017, and re-elected again May 11, 2021. The longest-serving mayor in Omaha's history was "Cowboy" Jim Dahlman, who served 20 years over eight terms. He was regarded as the "wettest mayor in America" because of the flourishing number of bars in Omaha during his tenure. Dahlman was a close associate of political boss Tom Dennison. During Dahlman's tenure, the city switched from its original strong-mayor form of government to a city commission government. In 1956, the city switched back.

The city clerk is Elizabeth Butler. The City of Omaha administers twelve departments, including finance, police, human rights, libraries and planning. The Omaha City Council is the legislative branch and has seven members elected from districts across the city. The council enacts local ordinances and approves the city budget. Government priorities and activities are established in a budget ordinance approved annually. The council takes official action through the passage of ordinances and resolutions. Nebraska's constitution grants the option of home rule to cities with more than 5,000 residents, meaning they may operate under their own charters. Omaha is one of only three cities in Nebraska to use this option, out of 17 eligible. The City of Omaha is considering consolidating with Douglas County government.

Although registered Republicans outnumbered Democrats in the 2nd congressional district, which includes Omaha, Democratic presidential candidate Barack Obama opened three campaign offices in the city with 15 staff members to cover the state in fall 2008. Mike Fahey, the former Democratic mayor of Omaha, said he would do whatever it took to deliver the district's electoral vote to Obama; and the Obama campaign considered the district "in play". Former Nebraska U.S. Senator Bob Kerrey and then-U.S. Senator Ben Nelson campaigned in the city for Obama, and in November 2008 Obama won the district's electoral vote. This was an historical win, as Obama became the first Democratic presidential candidate to win an electoral vote in Nebraska since 1964, only made possible by Nebraska's split electoral vote system.

In 2011, Nebraska lawmakers moved Offutt Air Force Base and the town of Bellevue — an area with a large minority population — out of the Omaha-based 2nd District and shifted in the Republican-heavy Omaha suburbs in Sarpy County. The move is expected to dilute the city's urban Democratic vote.

Omaha's 2nd District sent its single electoral vote for Joe Biden in the 2020 election. Biden's victory, by more than 20,000 votes, shows Omaha's and the 2nd Districts’ continuing trend toward Democratic politics in recent years.

Education

Omaha has many public and private educational institutions, including Omaha Public Schools, the largest public school district in Nebraska, which serves more than 47,750 students in more than 75 schools. After a contentious period of uncertainty, in 2007 the Nebraska Legislature approved a plan to create a learning community for Omaha-area school districts with a central administrative board.

The Roman Catholic Archdiocese of Omaha operates numerous private Catholic schools with 21,500 students in 32 elementary schools and nine high schools. They include St. Cecilia Grade School at in Midtown Omaha, Holy Cross at in Morton Meadows, St. Robert Bellarmine School at 120th and Pacific Street, St. Stephen the Martyr School in Millard, and Creighton Preparatory School, all of which have received the U.S. Department of Education Blue Ribbon School award.

The Westside Community Schools, also known as District 66, is a district in the heart of Omaha. It serves students in pre-kindergarten through the 12th grade and recorded a district enrollment of 6,123 students K-12 for the 2015–16 school year.
Through annexations Omaha also has the Millard Public Schools and Elkhorn Public Schools. Omaha is also home to Brownell-Talbot School, Nebraska's only preschool through grade 12, independent college preparatory school.

There are eleven colleges and universities among Omaha's higher education institutions, including the University of Nebraska Omaha. The University of Nebraska Medical Center in midtown Omaha is home to the Eppley Cancer Center, one of 66 designated Cancer Centers by the National Cancer Institute in the United States. The University of Nebraska College of Medicine, also on the UNMC campus, is ranked 7th in the country by U.S. News & World Report for primary care medical education.

Omaha's Creighton University is ranked the top non-doctoral regional university in the Midwestern United States by U.S. News & World Report. The Jesuit institution's  campus just outside Downtown Omaha in the new North Downtown district has a combined 6,700 students in its undergraduate, graduate, medical, and law schools.

There are more than 10 other colleges and universities in the Omaha metro area.

Media

The city is the focus of the Omaha designated market area, and is the 76th largest in the United States.

Magazines
Omaha Magazine

Newspapers
The major daily newspaper in Nebraska is the Omaha World-Herald, formerly the largest employee-owned newspaper in the United States. Weeklies in the city include the Midlands Business Journal (weekly business publication); American Classifieds (formerly Thrifty Nickel), a weekly classified newspaper; The Reader, as well as The Omaha Star. Founded in 1938 in North Omaha, the Star is Nebraska's only African-American newspaper.

Television networks and cable TV
Omaha's four television news stations include: KETV 7 (ABC- branded NewsWatch 7), KMTV-TV 3 (CBS- branded 3 News Now), WOWT 6 (NBC Omaha), and KPTM 42 (FOX 42). There is a fifth station, KXVO 15 (branded CW 15), though it does not air any news content. Cox Communications provides cable television services throughout the metropolitan area. Prism TV offered through CenturyLink is a broadband TV option also available throughout the Omaha area. Satellite providers such as DirecTV and Dish Network and the local programming they offer are also available throughout the metropolitan area.

Infrastructure

In 2008 Kiplinger's Personal Finance magazine ranked Omaha the No. 3 best city in the United States to "live, work and play". Omaha's growth has required the constant development of new urban infrastructure that influence, allow and encourage the constant expansion of the city.

Utilities
Retail natural gas and water public utilities in Omaha are provided by the Metropolitan Utilities District. Nebraska is the only public power state in the nation. All electric utilities are non-profit and customer-owned. Electricity in the city is provided by the Omaha Public Power District. Public housing is governed by the Omaha Housing Authority governs Public housing and Metro Area Transit provides public transportation. CenturyLink and Cox provide local telephone and internet services. The City of Omaha maintains two modern sewage treatment plants.

Portions of the Enron corporation began as Northern Natural Gas Company in Omaha. Northern provides three natural gas lines to Omaha. Enron formerly owned UtiliCorp United, Inc., which became Aquila, Inc. Peoples Natural Gas, a division of Aquila, Inc., serves several surrounding communities around the Omaha metropolitan area, including Plattsmouth.

Health care
There are several hospitals in Omaha. Research hospitals include the Boys Town National Research Hospital, the University of Nebraska Medical Center and the Creighton University Medical Center. The Boys Town facility is well known for hearing-related research and treatment. The University of Nebraska Medical Center hosts the Eppley Institute for Research in Cancer and Allied Diseases, a world-renowned cancer treatment facility named in honor of Omahan Eugene Eppley.

Transportation

Omaha's central role in the history of transportation across America earned it the nickname "Gate City of the West." Despite President Lincoln's decree that Council Bluffs, Iowa, be the starting point for the Union Pacific Railroad, construction began from Omaha on the eastern portion of the first transcontinental railroad. By the middle of the 20th century, nearly every major railroad served Omaha.

Today, the Omaha Rail and Commerce Historic District celebrates this connection, along with the listing of the Burlington Train Station and the Union Station on the National Register of Historic Places. First housed in the former Herndon House, the Union Pacific Railroad's corporate headquarters have been in Omaha since the company began. Their new headquarters, the Union Pacific Center, opened in Downtown Omaha in 2004.

Amtrak, the national passenger rail system, provides service through Omaha. The Greyhound Lines terminal is at 1601 Jackson St. in downtown Omaha. The terminal also provides service to Jefferson Lines, Burlington Trailways, and Express Arrow. Megabus has a stop at Crossroads Mall – N 72nd St. between Dodge St. and Cass St. – and provides service to Des Moines, Iowa City, and Chicago. Metro Transit, previously known as Metro Area Transit, is the local bus system.

Omaha's position as a transportation center was finalized with the 1872 opening of the Union Pacific Missouri River Bridge that linked the transcontinental railroad to the railroads terminating in Council Bluffs. In 1888, the first road bridge, the Douglas Street Bridge, opened. In the 1890s, the Illinois Central drawbridge opened as the largest bridge of its type in the world. Omaha's Missouri River road bridges are now entering their second generation, including the Works Progress Administration-financed South Omaha Bridge, now called Veteran's Memorial Bridge, which was added to the National Register of Historic Places. In 2006, Omaha and Council Bluffs announced joint plans to build the Missouri River Pedestrian Bridge, which opened in 2008.

Today, the primary mode of transportation in Omaha is by automobile, with I-80, I-480, I-680, I-29, and U.S. Route 75 (JFK Freeway and North Freeway) providing freeway service across the metropolitan area. The expressway along West Dodge Road (U.S. Route 6 and Nebraska Link 28B) and U.S. Route 275 has been upgraded to freeway standards from I-680 to Fremont. City owned Metro Transit, formerly as MAT Metro Area Transit, provides public bus service to hundreds of locations throughout the Metro.

A 2017 study by Walk Score ranked Omaha 26th most walkable of fifty largest U.S. cities. Of the top 50 most walkable cities only one, Omaha, Nebraska, saw its Walk Score decline, and it only decreased 0.3 points from last year. There is an extensive trail system throughout the city for walkers, runners, bicyclists, and other pedestrian modes of transportation.

Omaha is laid out on a grid plan, with 12 blocks to the mile with a north-to-south house numbering system. Omaha is the location of a historic boulevard system designed by H.W.S. Cleveland who sought to combine the beauty of parks with the pleasure of driving cars. The historic Florence and Fontenelle Boulevards, as well as the modern Sorenson Parkway, are important elements in this system. The City of Omaha has proposed the Omaha Streetcar through the city's urban core, with proposed extensions to Council Bluffs, Iowa, Eppley Airfield, North Omaha, West Omaha, and Bellevue, Nebraska.

Eppley Airfield, Omaha's airport, serves the region with over 5 million passengers in 2018. United Airlines, Southwest Airlines, Delta Air Lines, American Airlines, Alaska Airlines, Allegiant Air, and Frontier Airlines, serve the airport with direct and connecting service. As of 2018, the airport has non-stop service to 34 destinations. General aviation airports that serve the area include the Millard Municipal Airport, North Omaha Airport and the Council Bluffs Airport. Offutt Air Force Base continues to serve as a military airbase; it is at the southern edge of Bellevue, which in turn lies immediately south of Omaha.

Notable people

In popular culture
In 1939, Omaha hosted the world premiere of the film Union Pacific and the accompanying three-day celebration drew 250,000 people. A special train from Hollywood carried director Cecil B. DeMille and stars Barbara Stanwyck and Joel McCrea. Omaha's Boys Town was made famous by the Spencer Tracy and Mickey Rooney movie Boys Town. Omaha has been featured in recent years by a handful of relatively big budget motion pictures. The city's most extensive exposure can be accredited to Omaha native Alexander Payne, the Oscar-nominated director who shot parts of About Schmidt, Citizen Ruth and Election in the city and suburbs of Papillion and La Vista.

The Looney Tunes short Boobs in the Woods featured Porky Pig revealing that he had a license to sell hair tonic to bald eagles in Omaha, Nebraska.

Built in 1962, Omaha's Cinerama was called Indian Hills Theater. Its demolition in 2001 by the Nebraska Methodist Health System was unpopular, with objections from local historical and cultural groups and luminaries from around the world. The Dundee Theatre is the lone surviving single-screen movie theater in Omaha and still shows films. A recent development to the Omaha film scene was the addition of Film Streams's Ruth Sokolof Theater in North Downtown. The two-screen theater is part of the Slowdown facility. It features new American independents, foreign films, documentaries, classics, themed series, and director retrospectives. There are many new theaters opening in Omaha. In addition to the five Douglas Theatres venues in Omaha, two more are opening, including Midtown Crossing Theatres, on 32nd and Farnam Streets by the Mutual of Omaha Building. Westroads Mall has opened a new multiplex movie theater with 14 screens, operated by Rave Motion Pictures.

Songs about Omaha include "Omaha" by Moby Grape, "Omaha", by the indie rock band Tapes 'n Tapes, "Omaha" by Counting Crows, "Omaha Celebration" by Pat Metheny, "Omaha" sung by Waylon Jennings, "Greater Omaha" by Desaparecidos, "Omaha Stylee" by 311, "(Ready Or Not) Omaha Nebraska" by Bowling for Soup, and "Omaha" by Toro y Moi

Popular young adult novel Eleanor & Park by Rainbow Rowell (St. Martin's Press, 2013) takes place in Omaha.

The 1935 winner of the Triple Crown of Thoroughbred Racing was named Omaha, and after traveling the world the horse eventually retired to a farm south of the city. The horse made promotional appearances at Ak-Sar-Ben during the 1950s and following his death in 1959 was buried at the racetrack's Circle of Champions.

In the television show The Big Bang Theory, one of the show's main characters, Penny, is from Omaha.

Omaha is also the hometown of the Wizard in L. Frank Baum's children's novel The Wonderful Wizard of Oz.

In Breaking Bad, Saul Goodman says in the penultimate episode that "If I'm lucky, a month from now, best case scenario, I'm managing a Cinnabon in Omaha," and in the prequel, spin-off, and sequel, Better Call Saul, he is manager of a Cinnabon in Omaha under the alias Gene Takavic.

Sister cities
Omaha has six sister cities:
 Braunschweig, Lower Saxony, Germany
 Shizuoka, Japan
 Šiauliai, Lithuania
 Xalapa, Veracruz, Mexico
 Naas, County Kildare, Ireland
 Yantai, Shandong, China
 Carlentini, Sicily, Italy

See also

Benson neighborhood (Omaha, Nebraska)
Dundee-Happy Hollow Historic District
Florence, Nebraska
Gold Coast Historic District (Omaha, Nebraska)
History of Omaha
Midtown Omaha
Millard, Omaha, Nebraska
North Omaha, Nebraska
Old Market (Omaha, Nebraska)
Omaha Coalition of Citizen Patrols
South Omaha, Nebraska
USS Omaha, 4 ships

Notes

References

External links

City of Omaha official website
Omaha Convention & Visitors Bureau

 
Cities in Nebraska
County seats in Nebraska
Metropolitan areas of Nebraska
Nebraska populated places on the Missouri River
Populated places established in 1854
Cities in Douglas County, Nebraska
Former colonial and territorial capitals in the United States
1854 establishments in Nebraska Territory